Stefano Scodanibbio (18 June 1956 – 8 January 2012) was an Italian musician who reached international prominence as a double bassist and composer.

Biography
Scodanibbio was born in Macerata. He studied double bass with Fernando Grillo and composition with Fausto Razzi and Salvatore Sciarrino. From an early age he was interested in the double bass as a solo instrument and in promoting new trends in contemporary European and American music. In 1983 he founded the Rassegna di Nuova Musica  in Macerata. He has been described as "a tremendous bassist, a fearless improviser, and a gifted composer".

The many composers who have written for him include Brian Ferneyhough, Salvatore Sciarrino, Sylvano Bussotti, Iannis Xenakis, Fernando Mencherini, Gérard Grisey, Roberto Paci Dalò, Giacinto Scelsi, Julio Estrada.   He worked for a long period with Luigi Nono.

He worked closely with the musician Terry Riley, as well as with choreographers and dancers such as Virgilio Sieni, Patricia Kuypers, Hervé Diasnas, the poets Edoardo Sanguineti and Gian Ruggero Manzoni, the philosopher Giorgio Agamben, the artist Gianni Dessì and the director and playwright Rodrigo Garcia. He played regularly with Rohan de Saram and Markus Stockhausen.

From the 1990s he taught master classes and seminars at the Shepherd School of Music at Rice University, University of California Berkeley, Stanford University, Oberlin Conservatory, Musikhochschule Stuttgart, Conservatoire de Paris, Milan Conservatory, etc. In 1996 he taught double bass at Darmstadt Ferienkurse. He died in Cuernavaca, aged 55.

Discography
1997 - Lazy Afternoon among the Crocodiles - Terry Riley & Stefano Scodanibbio (Pierrot Lunaire)
1998 - Voyage That Never Ends (New Albion)
1998 - One says Mexico 
1999 - Postkarten - Stefano Scodanibbio & Edoardo Sanguineti
2000 - Geografia amorosa
2001 - Six Duos  (New Albion)
2001 - Visas per Vittorio Reta
2004 - My new address (Stradivarius)
2005 - Diamond Fiddle Language - Terry Riley & Stefano Scodanibbio (Magonza/Wergo)
2006 - Visas per Vittorio Reta - (Le Lettere, Florence)
2010 - On Debussy's Piano And... - Thollem/Scodanibbio (die Schachtel)
2010 - Oltracuidansa (Mode Records, New York)
2013 - Reinventions - Quartetto Prometeo (ECM records)
2017 - Bass Duo (with William Parker), Centering Records; recorded Udin&Jazz 2008 Festival in Udine, Italy

Notes

External links
Official site
Rassegna di Nuova Musica, Macerata
Stefano Scodanibbio in Discogs
Stefano Scodanibbio in All About Jazz
http://www.jornada.unam.mx/2012/01/10/cultura/a05n1cul

1956 births
2012 deaths
20th-century classical composers
Italian classical composers
Italian male classical composers
Italian classical double-bassists
Male double-bassists
20th-century Italian composers
20th-century Italian male musicians